Mike Bloom may refer to:
 Mike Bloom (musician) (born 1975), plays with Rilo Kiley and The Elected
 Mike Bloom (basketball) (1915–1993), NBA player in the 1940s who played for the Celtics and the Lakers
 Mike Bloom (ice hockey) (born 1952), NHL player in the 1970s who played for the Capitals and the Red Wings